David Gopito (born February 2, 1946) is a Zimbabwean sculptor.

A native of Mutare, Gopito studied sculpture with his brother, John Gwatirwa. In 1969, he moved to Victoria Falls, working there at the Craft Village for two years. Currently he lives and works in Chitungwiza.

External links
Biographical sketch

1946 births
Living people
20th-century Zimbabwean sculptors
People from Mutare